Evolution is the fourth EP released by the anarcho-punk band Subhumans. It was also the band's first vinyl release on their own label, Bluurg Records (bar the "Wessex '82" split EP). The EP was also released as part of the 1985 "EP-LP" compilation, which compiles the band's first four EP's onto a single record.

Track listing
1. "Evolution"

2. "So Much Money"

3. "Germ"

4. "Not Me"

Personnel
Dick Lucas - vocals
Bruce - guitar
Grant - bass
Trotsky - drums
Nick Lant - cover artwork
John Loder - engineer

1983 EPs
Subhumans (British band) albums